Chotok Waterfalls also known as Moola Chotok Waterfalls are situated in a village Moola, Khuzdar District of Balochistan the province of Pakistan. Chotok waterfalls falls between the two hills into a stream of cool water.

See also 
Moola Chotok
Hanna-Urak Waterfall
List of waterfalls of Pakistan

References 

Waterfalls of Pakistan
Landforms of Balochistan (Pakistan)
Tourist attractions in Balochistan, Pakistan
Khuzdar District